Adwoa Yamoah is a Canadian beauty pageant contestant who placed 1st runner-up at Miss Universe Canada 2012 
and represented Canada in the Miss Universe 2012 pageant, replacing Sahar Biniaz who had been named Miss Universe Canada.

Pageantry
Yamoah participated in Miss Universe 2012, and was named "Best Runway Model", while Sahar Biniaz became Miss Universe Canada 2012.
Biniaz was expected to represent Canada at Miss Universe 2012 in Las Vegas, but Adwoa Yamoah, the first runner-up, got the opportunity to represent Canada.

In 2018, Jeffrey Toobin of The New Yorker reported that Donald Trump, owner of the Miss Universe Organization at the time, personally interfered with the selection of finalists in the Miss Universe contestant selection, in order to further his other business interests around the world.  Tobin's reporting was based on testimony form contestants, including Yamoah, who said:

References

External links
 Miss Universe Canada official website

Living people
People from Accra
Canadian cheerleaders
Canadian female models
Canadian Football League cheerleaders
Canadian people of Ghanaian descent
Miss Universe 2012 contestants
Sportspeople from Calgary
Year of birth missing (living people)